Theobald Smith FRS(For) HFRSE (July 31, 1859 – December 10, 1934) was a pioneering epidemiologist, bacteriologist, pathologist and professor. Smith is widely considered to be America's first internationally-significant medical research scientist.

Smith's research work included the study of babesiosis (originally known as Texas cattle fever) and the more-general epidemiology of cattle diseases caused by tick borne diseases. He also described the bacterium Salmonella enterica (formerly called Salmonella choleraesuis), a species of Salmonella, named for the Bureau of Animal Industry chief Daniel E. Salmon. Additional work in studying the phenomena of anaphylaxis led to it being referred to as the Theobald Smith phenomenon. 

Smith's contribution that is well known even by many laypeople is called the "law of declining virulence". This is based on his disproved notion that there is a “delicate equilibrium” between host and pathogen and that they develop a "mutually benign relationship" over time. This was at most an educated guess (in other words a hypothesis) and never became a scientific theory, but it became accepted as conventional wisdom and was even called the "law of declining virulence". It has been disproved and replaced by the trade-off model, which explains that each host-pathogen relationship must be considered separately and that there is no general pattern that predicts how each of these relationships will develop, and definitely no inevitability of decreased virulence.

Smith taught at Columbian University (now George Washington University) and established the school's department of bacteriology, the first  at a medical school in the United States. He later worked at Harvard University and the Rockefeller Institute.

He was a trustee of the Carnegie Institution from 1914 until his death in 1934.

Education 
Smith was born in Albany, New York, the son of Philip Smith and his wife, Theresa Kexel.

He received a Bachelor of Philosophy degree from Cornell University in 1881, followed by an MD from Albany Medical College in 1883. After his graduation from medical school, Smith held a variety of temporary positions which might broadly be considered under the modern heading of "medical laboratory technician". After some prodding by his former professors, Smith secured a new research lab assistant position with the Veterinary Division of the US Department of Agriculture (USDA) in Washington, D.C., beginning his position there in December 1883.

Research 
Smith became the Inspector of the newly created Bureau of Animal Industry (BAI) in 1884. Established by Congress to combat a wide range of animal diseases—from infectious disease of swine to bovine pneumonia, Texas cattle fever to glanders—Smith worked under Daniel E. Salmon, a veterinarian and Chief of the BAI. Smith also discovered the bacterial  type species which would eventually form the genus Salmonella. After two years of work studying the efficacy of bacterial vaccination in pigs, Smith erroneously believed he had found the causative agent of hog cholera.

Smith turned his attention to Texas fever, a debilitating cattle disease; this work is detailed in a chapter in Microbe Hunters, by Paul de Kruif. In 1889, he along with the veterinarian F.L. Kilbourne discovered Babesia bigemina, the tick-borne protozoan parasite responsible for Texas fever. This marked the first time that an arthropod had been definitively linked with the transmission of an infectious disease and presaged the eventual discovery of insects as important vectors in a number of diseases (see Tick-borne disease, Mosquito-borne disease yellow fever, malaria, etc.).

Smith also taught at Columbian University in Washington, D.C. (now George Washington University) from 1886 to 1895, establishing the school's Department of Bacteriology. In 1887, Smith began research on water sanitation in his spare time, investigating the level of fecal coliform contamination in the nearby Potomac River. Over the next five years, Smith expanded his studies to include the Hudson River and its tributaries.

While Smith's work at the BAI had been highly productive, he found the rigid federal government bureaucracy stiffing and complained about the lack of leadership from his supervisor. In 1895 Smith moved to Cambridge, Massachusetts to accept a dual appointment serving as professor of comparative pathology at Harvard University as well as directing the pathology lab at the Massachusetts State Board of Health.

Smith joined the Rockefeller Institute for Medical Research as Director of the Department of Animal Pathology in 1915 and remained there until his retirement in 1929.

In 1933, Smith was awarded the Royal Society's prestigious Copley Medal "For his original research and observation on diseases of animals and man.".

Publications
Parasitism and Disease (1934)

Other discoveries 
 Observed differences between human and bovine tuberculosis (1895).
 Discussed the possibility of mosquitos as a malaria transmission vector (1899).
 Variation and bacterial pathogenesis (1900).
 Discovered anaphylaxis (1903), which is also sometimes referred to as "Theobald Smith's phenomenon".
 Brucellosis infections
 Used toxin/antitoxin as a vaccine for diphtheria (1909).
 In the process of investigating an epidemic of infectious abortions of cattle in 1919, Smith described the bacteria responsible for fetal membrane disease in cows now known as Campylobacter fetus.

References

External links 
 
 Paul de Kruif Microbe Hunters (Blue Ribbon Books) Harcourt Brace & Company Inc., New York 1926: ch. VIII Theobald Smith: Ticks and Texas Fever (pp. 234-251)

1859 births
1934 deaths
Physicians from Albany, New York
Cornell University alumni
Albany Medical College alumni
George Washington University faculty
Harvard University faculty
Members of the United States National Academy of Sciences
Foreign Members of the Royal Society
Honorary Fellows of the Royal Society of Edinburgh
Recipients of the Copley Medal
Manson medal winners
American veterinarians
Male veterinarians
American bacteriologists
American parasitologists
American pathologists
Environmental health practitioners
Scientists from New York (state)
Presidents of the American Society for Microbiology